Tonight is the third studio album by American R&B group Silk, released on March 23, 1999 on Elektra Entertainment. It was their first album in four years and the reason for the break was due to the group wanting to be more involved in the creative process. Another reason for the hiatus was due to the lackluster performance of their previous album Silk (1995), which caused the group to seek new management after dealing with financial and legal issues. After severing ties with their former managers, they were managed by Sonja Norwood, mother of singer/actress Brandy Norwood. They were soon given the green light to record a new album by Elektra's then-president Sylvia Rhone, who let them take their time to record the album until they had the right songs.

Most of the production duties were split between group member Gary Jenkins and producer Darrell "Delite" Allamby. The latter was brought in due to his previous work with Gerald Levert, Busta Rhymes and LSG. Additional production was provided by Maurice Wilcher, Steve "Million Dollar Man" Morales, and Donald Parks. Tonight peaked at number 21 on the US Billboard 200 and number eight on the Top R&B/Hip-Hop Albums chart. The album spwaned the hit single "If You", which peaked at number 13 on the US Billboard Hot 100, becoming their biggest hit since "Freak Me" (1993) and follow-up "Meeting In My Bedroom". Tonight proved to be their second most successful album, right behind their 1992 debut Lose Control. The album was certified platinum by the Recording Industry Association of America (RIAA) in 1999.

Critical reception 

AllMusic editor Stephen Thomas Erlewine found Tonight "a little predictable. If you're at all familiar with the previous two records, you know what to expect lyrically and musically from every track on the record, and chances are, you won't be too disappointed by this slightly over-produced, ballad-heavy set. The uninitiated may find the constant sex talk a little ridiculous and monotonous, but they'll likely groove on Darrell "Delite" Allamby's production, which updates classic '70s soul and funk. It can be a little glossy and glib, as well as a little lightweight in the songwriting department, but that Allamby production makes Tonight fairly effective romantic mood music – even with Silk's vocal histrionics."

Track listing 

Notes
  signifies a co-producer
  signifies an additional producer

Personnel 
Credits adapted from the liner notes of Tonight.

Performers and musicians

Darrell "Delite" Allamby  – background vocals, keyboards, programming
Anthony "A.D." Donelson – guitar
Kenneth "Kenny Flav" Dickerson – keyboards, programming
Jerry Flowers – drum programming
Ben "Smooth" Howe – keyboards, programming
Gary Jenkins – guitar, keyboards, programming
Avery Johnson – drum programming
Link – background vocals
Terrence T. Nelson – drum programming
Ninja – guitar
Paul Pesco – guitar
Zack Scott – drums
Silk – background vocals
Maurice Wilcher – keyboards, programming

Technical

Darrell "Delite" Allamby – executive producer, engineer
Alli – art direction and design
Kwaku Alston – photography
Ben Arrindell – engineer
Chris Diaz – recording engineer
Kenneth "Kenny Flav" Dickerson – engineer
Paul Fleming – recording engineer
John Grimes – recording engineer
Shawn Grove – recording engineer
Bryan Kinkead – recording engineer
Paul Logus – mixing engineer
Rico Lumpkins – engineer
Vernon Mungo – engineer
Terrence T. Nelson – recording engineer
Herb Powers – mastering engineer
Silk – executive producer
Brian Smith – recording engineer
Jason Stokes – recording engineer
Darryl Williams – executive producer
Jimmy Zupano – recording engineer

Charts

Weekly charts

Year-end charts

Certifications

Release history

References 

1999 albums
Silk (group) albums